The Kilgore Drillers were a minor league baseball team that played in the Lone Star League from 1947 to 1948 and the East Texas League from 1949 to 1950. Based in Kilgore, Texas, it was the city's last professional baseball team. Joe Kracher managed and played for the team in 1947, 1948 and 1949, leading the club to consecutive league championships in '47 and '48 (the team lost the league finals in '49). Fred Baczewski also played for the team in 1948 and the 1949 club featured Merv Connors and Jerry Fahr. The 1950 club, managed by Al Kubski, lost in the first round of the league playoffs. Connors played for the team that year, as well.

References

Baseball teams established in 1947
Baseball teams disestablished in 1950
1947 establishments in Texas
1950 disestablishments in Texas
Defunct minor league baseball teams
Defunct baseball teams in Texas
Gregg County, Texas
Rusk County, Texas
East Texas League teams